Emily Cunningham is an American user experience designer and environmentalist. She is known for co-founding Amazon Employees For Climate Justice and for being illegally terminated by her former employer, Amazon.

Early life and education 
Cunningham was born in Tucson, Arizona and grew up in various cities around Arizona between Tucson, Phoenix, and Globe. She moved to Seattle, Washington in 1998.

Cunningham has a Bachelor of Arts in sociology and a Master of Science in information management.

Activism at Amazon 
Cunningham joined Amazon as a user experience designer in 2013.

In late 2018, Cunningham led an employee-shareholder proposal asking Amazon to develop a climate change initiative. In January 2019, Cunningham, along with Maren Costa and others from the group calling themselves Amazon Employees For Climate Justice, met with Amazon leadership to discuss the proposal, and in February, the company announced a carbon offset plan and asked for the employees to withdraw the proposal. At the annual shareholder meeting the following May 2019, Cunningham delivered a speech to the chief executive officer of the company, Jeff Bezos, asking him to commit to the proposed resolution. The proposal was not approved. 

Cunningham was terminated in April 2020 and filed an unlawful termination charge with the National Labor Relations Board (NLRB). The NLRB determined that Cunningham's termination was unlawful. Amazon denied any wrongdoing, but reached a settlement with Cunningham and the NLRB. Amazon was required to pay back wages and post notices in offices and warehouses informing employees that the company is not allowed to discharge employees for organizing.

See also 

 Abigail Borah
 Nicole Hernandez Hammer
 Julia Butterfly Hill

References 

Activists from Arizona
Activists from Seattle
Amazon (company) people
American designers
American environmentalists
American whistleblowers
Living people

People from Globe, Arizona

People from Phoenix, Arizona
People from Seattle
People from Tucson, Arizona
University of Washington alumni
Year of birth missing (living people)